The EuroLeague individual highs for players in single games played. These are the lists of the individual statistical single game highs of the EuroLeague, which is the top-tier level European-wide professional club basketball league. The individual stats single game highs are broken down by sections of time, based on who organized the league and when certain statistics were officially counted.

From 1958 to 2000, the competition was run by solely FIBA. Under FIBA's organization, the competition was initially called the FIBA European Champions' Cup, and was later first re-named to the FIBA European League, and finally to the FIBA EuroLeague. During the 2000–01 season, the competition was split into two different leagues for just that one season.

There was the then newly formed 2000–01 EuroLeague competition organized by EuroLeague Basketball (EB), which kept the majority of the major clubs in the competition, as well as its EuroLeague name. There was also the new version of FIBA's competition, which was re-named from the FIBA EuroLeague to the FIBA SuproLeague. While the EuroLeague Basketball competition kept the original EuroLeague name of the competition, FIBA's league kept the original ending format of the competition, as it retained the EuroLeague Final Four event, which was re-named from the FIBA EuroLeague Final Four, to the FIBA SuproLeague Final Four.

For the following 2001–02 season, FIBA cancelled its SuproLeague competition, and EuroLeague Basketball's competition gained all of the competition's major clubs, as well as the Final Four format, which was then re-named back to the EuroLeague Final Four. EuroLeague Basketball's competition officially recognized all of the seasons of FIBA's competitions, including all of its Finals, Final Fours, league champions, stats, records, and awards. The stats, records, and awards from the two competitions are categorized by each individual organizing body (EB and FIBA).

Points scored has been kept as an official basketball stat of the EuroLeague, since its inaugural 1958 season. Starting with the 1984–85 season, attempted and made 3-point field goals also became official statistics. Since the 1991–92 season, rebounds, assists, steals, double-doubles, and triple-doubles have also been kept as official stats of the competition. Blocks were added as an official stat of the competition in 1999, during the second half of the 1998–99 season. The Performance Index Rating (PIR) has been kept as an official stat of the competition since the EB era began, starting with the EuroLeague 2000–01 season.

EuroLeague Basketball (since the year 2000)
Nationalities by national team:

40+ points in a game (since the year 2000)
Since the beginning of the 2000–01 season (EuroLeague Basketball era):

20+ rebounds in a game (since the year 2000)
Since the beginning of the 2000–01 season (EuroLeague Basketball era):

15+ assists in a game (since the year 2000)
Since the beginning of the 2000–01 season (EuroLeague Basketball era):

8+ steals in a game (since the year 2000)
Since the beginning of the 2000–01 season (EuroLeague Basketball era):

6+ blocks in a game (since the year 2000)
Since the beginning of the 2000–01 season (EuroLeague Basketball era):

8+ 3 pointers made in a game (since the year 2000)

Since the beginning of the 2000–01 season (EuroLeague Basketball era):

Performance Index Rating (since the year 2000)

Since the beginning of the 2000–01 season (EuroLeague Basketball era):

FIBA EuroLeague & FIBA SuproLeague (1991–2001)
Nationalities by national team:

40+ points in a game (1991–2001)
From the 1991–92 season to the 2000–01 SuproLeague season (FIBA era):

20+ rebounds in a game (1991–2001)
From the 1991–92 season to the 2000–01 SuproLeague season (FIBA era):

13+ assists in a game (1991–2001)
From the 1991–92 season to the 2000–01 SuproLeague season (FIBA era):

9+ steals in a game (1991–2001)
From the 1991–92 season to the 2000–01 SuproLeague season (FIBA era):

5+ blocks in a game (1999–2001)
From 1999 to the 2000–01 SuproLeague season (FIBA era):

8+ 3 pointers made in a game (1984–2001)

From the 1984–85 season to the 2000–01 SuproLeague season (FIBA era):

Triple-Doubles (1991–present)
Since the beginning of the 1991–92 season (FIBA & EuroLeague Basketball eras):

FIBA EuroLeague, FIBA SuproLeague & EuroLeague Basketball (1958–present)
Nationalities by national team:

40+ points in a game (1958–present)
From the 1958 FIBA European Champions Cup season to the 2000–01 FIBA SuproLeague season, and the Euroleague 2000–01 season to the present (FIBA & Euroleague Basketball eras):

The most points scored in a single EuroLeague game, since the competition began with the 1958 season, including all league formats up until the present time. Includes all games in which a player scored at least 40 points.

Players that scored 50 or more points in a single EuroLeague game

Players that scored between 47–49 points in a single EuroLeague game

Players that scored between 44–46 points in a single EuroLeague game

Players that scored between 40–43 points in a single EuroLeague game

References

External links
EuroLeague Basketball official website 
FIBA EuroLeague official website 

EuroLeague statistics